Dag Ole Teigen (born 10 August 1982 in Volda) is a Norwegian politician for the Labour Party (AP). He represented Hordaland in the Norwegian Parliament, where he met from 2005-2009 in the place of Anne-Grete Strøm-Erichsen, who was appointed to a government position. He was elected on his own right to serve a full term from 2009-2013.

Teigen was a member of the Standing Committee on Health and Care Services from 2005-2009, and a member of the Standing Committee on Finance and Economic Affairs from 2009-2013.

He holds a master's degree in public policy and management from the University of Agder (2014), and a Bachelor of Arts from the University of Bergen (2004). He participated at The Oxford Experience in 2013.

He was elected to the municipality council of Fjell in 2003. He is a member of Mensa.

Parliamentary Committee duties 
2005 - 2009 member of the Standing Committee on Health and Care Services.
2009 - 2013 member of the Standing Committee on Finance and Economic Affairs.

External links

1982 births
Living people
Labour Party (Norway) politicians
Members of the Storting
Mensans
21st-century Norwegian politicians
People from Volda